John Henry Bryan Jr. (October 5, 1936 – October 1, 2018) was an American businessman who was the chairman and CEO of Sara Lee Corporation from 1975 until 2001.  He also was the philanthropic driving force behind the creation of Millennium Park in Chicago.

Early life and education
John Henry Bryan Jr. was born on October 5, 1936 in West Point, Mississippi, to John Henry Bryan Sr. and Catherine (Kitty) Wilkerson Bryan.  He has three siblings: George W. Bryan, also a successful businessman, Caroline Bryan Harrell, and the late Catherine Bryan Dill. He attended Mississippi State University and graduated with a BA in Economics and Business from Rhodes College in Memphis, Tennessee.

Professional career

After college, Bryan led his family's specialty meat business Bryan Foods, which he sold to Chicago-based Consolidated Foods in 1968.  He stayed on overseeing the family's business as a unit of Consolidated Foods, and Consolidated Foods made him the company's president in 1974 and its CEO in 1975.

From 1975 to 2000, he served as CEO of the Sara Lee Corporation, which changed its name from Consolidated Foods to Sara Lee Corp. in 1985. He sat on the Board of Directors of Goldman Sachs, where he served as Lead Director. Previously, he sat on the Board of the Bank One Corporation, Amoco, British Petroleum and General Motors.

He sat on the Boards of Trustees of the University of Chicago and the Art Institute of Chicago. He also served as Chairman of the Board of Millennium Park in Chicago. He was a member of the Council on Foreign Relations, the Trilateral Commission, the Chicago Council on Global Affairs, The Business Council, the World Economic Forum, the Bilderberg Group and Americans United to Save the Arts and Humanities. A Democrat, he has supported Bill Bradley, Hillary Clinton and Barack Obama. He was a recipient of the French Legion of Honor.

From 1984 until his death, Bryan lived on Crab Tree Farm in Lake Bluff, Illinois. The farm has cattle, horses, sheep, chickens, and turkeys, and it grows hay, corn, and soybeans.

Philanthropy 

Bryan was known for raising money for building expansion and renovation projects for the Lyric Opera of Chicago, the Chicago Symphony Orchestra and the Art Institute of Chicago.  He also helped raise more than $200 million in private funding for Millennium Park in Chicago.  He also raised key funding to preserve the Farnsworth House in Plano, Illinois.

References

1936 births
2018 deaths
People from West Point, Mississippi
People from Lake Bluff, Illinois
Businesspeople from Illinois
Businesspeople from Mississippi
Mississippi State University alumni
Rhodes College alumni
Sara Lee Corporation
BP people
General Motors people
Goldman Sachs people
American chief executives of food industry companies
20th-century American businesspeople